Gyula Sax (18 June 1951 – 25 January 2014) was a Hungarian chess grandmaster and International Arbiter (1995).

In 1972 he won the European Junior Chess Championship in Groningen. Sax was awarded the IM title in 1972 and the GM title in 1974. Gyula Sax was the Hungarian Chess Champion in 1976 and 1977 (jointly). 

He placed first at Rovinj-Zagreb 1975, Vinkovci 1976, Las Palmas Invitation (together with Vladimir Tukmakov) 1978, IBM international chess tournament 1979 (together with Vlastimil Hort), and Wijk aan Zee 1989 (shared in a four-way tie). He won the 1978 Canadian Open Chess Championship and the strong Lugano Open in 1984.

Gyula Sax participated twice in a row in the Candidates Tournament after qualifying at the Subotica Interzonal in 1987 and at the Manila Interzonal in 1990 respectively but was eliminated in the Candidates in 1988 by Nigel Short (+0=3−2) and in 1991 after extra-time by then sixty years old Viktor Korchnoi (+1=6-1; +0 =1-1 rapid chess). His highest Elo rating was 2610 in January 1988 and again in January 1989, with his best world ranking on position 12 shared in the (half-year-list) January to June 1989.

Judit Polgár paid tribute to him shortly after his death:

Notable chess games
Vasily Smyslov vs Gyula Sax, Tilburg 1979, King's Indian, Fianchetto Variation (A49), 0-1 A close and symmetrical endgame won by Sax against an endgame master and former world champion Smyslov.

References

External links 

 

1951 births
2014 deaths
Sportspeople from Budapest
Chess grandmasters
Chess Olympiad competitors
Chess arbiters
Hungarian chess players